Glaucoma medication is divided into groups based on chemical structure and pharmacologic action. The goal of currently available glaucoma therapy is to preserve visual function by lowering intraocular pressure (IOP), below a level that is likely to produce further damage to the nerve.

The more advanced the glaucomatous process on initial presentation, the lower the target range generally needs to be to prevent further progression. This more aggressive target is meant to minimize the risk of progressive glaucoma damage and vision loss. Once the optic nerve is damaged, it is more likely to incur more damage, and if severe visual loss is present, there is greater impact on the patient from any additional damage that may occur.

An initial reduction in the intraocular pressure of 20% from baseline is suggested. However, reduction of IOP to the target pressure range does not guarantee that progression will not occur. Therefore, the target pressure range needs to be constantly reassessed and changed as dictated by IOP fluctuations, optic nerve changes, and/or visual field progression.

Medical uses 
Agents in common clinical use include:

 Prostaglandin analogs
 Parasympathomimetic (miotic) agents, including cholinergic and anticholinesterase agents
 Carbonic anhydrase inhibitors (oral and topical)
 Adrenergic antagonists (nonselective and selective Beta1-antagonists)
 Alpha 2 agonists 
 Hyperosmotic agents
 Nitric oxide donators
 Rho kinase inhibitors

When comparing people with primary open-angle glaucoma and ocular hypertension, medical intraocular pressure lowering treatment slowed down the progression of visual field loss.

Comparison table

Combinations
 Fotil is a combination drug consisting of:
Pilocarpine, a parasympathomimetic
Timolol, a beta-adrenergic receptor antagonist

References

Glaucoma